Andelot-Morval is a commune in the Jura department in the region of Bourgogne-Franche-Comté in eastern France. The commune includes Morval that was a separate commune until 1973.

Population

See also
Communes of the Jura department

References

Communes of Jura (department)